Decoto is a neighborhood of Union City, California originally established as a separate community.

History

In 1867, Ezra Decoto, a local landowner sold land to the railroad. A settlement grew up around the place. A post office operated in Decoto from 1871 to 1959, with a closure from 1872 to 1875. In 1958, Decoto joined Alvarado to form Union City.

The Decoto area's population has historically been largely Hispanic, mostly Mexican-American. Starting in the 1930s and especially during World War Two, Mexican families began moving to Decoto. Many were braceros that came to work during the labor shortages during the War years. Decoto's population still has a large Latino contingent but other ethnicities, lead by various Asian groups, now constitutes the majority.

During the early 1970s, the Chicano Movement was in full swing and racial tensions were high in Decoto between the Latino community and police and the local Union City government. In April 1974, I  Alberto Terrones was shot and killed during a robbery by Union City police. Riots erupted in Decoto. To calm tensions, Union City Police Chief William Cann came to speak at Our lady of Rosary Catholic Church in Decoto. He was shot by a sniper and died a few months later.  

United Airlines Flight 615 crashed near Decoto on its approach to Oakland airport shortly before 4:30 AM Pacific Time on August 24, 1951.

Today the growth of the adjacent Transit District is leading to rapid changes in demographics.

References

Neighborhoods in Union City, California
Former populated places in California
Populated places established in 1867
1958 disestablishments in California
Former settlements in Alameda County, California
1867 establishments in California
Populated places disestablished in 1958